"He Don't Love You" is a song by Human Nature, released as the first single from their self-titled album Human Nature. The song peaked at No. 4 in Australia, and at No. 18 in the UK.

The Mark Hartley directed music video was nominated for Best Video at the ARIA Music Awards of 2001.

Music video
There were two versions filmed: one was the Australian version set in a factory, whilst the UK version was almost the same, but featured Neighbours star Holly Valance. The video also contains video and photo shoots by media. The cover of their self-titled album is a still from towards the end of the music video.

Track listing

UK CD single
 "He Don't Love You" – 3:09
 "He Don't Love You" (Amen UK Club Remix) – 5:48
 "Wishes" (new version) (Alan Glass, Andrew Klippel) – 4:02
 "He Don't Love You" (UK video) – 3:13

UK Cassette single
 "He Don't Love You" – 3:09
 "He Don't Love You" (Amen UK Radio Remix) – 3:33
 "Wishes" (new version)

Australian single
 "He Don't Love You" – 3:09
 "Angel of Your Heart" (Andrew Tierney, Jörgen Elofsson) – 4:01
 "Don't Cry" (US Radio Mix) (Alan Glass, Andrew Klippel) – 3:59

Note: "Angel of Your Heart" is incorrectly titled "Angel of My Heart".

UK and European single
 "He Don't Love You" – 3:09
 "He Don't Love You" (Amen UK Club Remix) – 5:48

Charts

Weekly charts

End of Year Chart

Certifications

References

External links
 

2000 singles
Human Nature (band) songs
Songs written by Steve Mac
Songs written by Wayne Hector
Song recordings produced by Steve Mac
2000 songs
Sony BMG singles
Synth-pop ballads